The 2001–02 season was the 73rd season in the existence of FC Sochaux-Montbéliard and the club's first season back in the top flight of French football. In addition to the domestic league, Sochaux participated in this season's editions of the Coupe de France, and Coupe de la Ligue. The season covered the period from 1 July 2001 to 30 June 2002.

First-team squad 
Squad at end of season

Competitions

Overview

Division 1

League table

Results summary

Results by round

Matches

Coupe de France

Coupe de la Ligue

Statistics

Goalscorers

References

FC Sochaux-Montbéliard seasons
Sochaux